Andi Kola (also Romanized as Andī Kolā; also known as Pā’īn Andī Kalā, and Pā’īn Andī Kolā) is a village in Karipey Rural District, Lalehabad District, Babol County, Mazandaran Province, Iran. At the 2006 census, its population was 916, in 260 families.

References 

Populated places in Babol County